Ivan Prelec (born 24 July 1987) is a Croatian professional football manager who is the manager of Danish Superliga club Vejle.

Managerial career
He started as a manager in 2006, with only 19 years. He led the youth team of Dinamo Zagreb in 2014, while later he became the manager of the U17 team. 

In 2017, he went to HNK Gorica, where, at first, he served as an assistant manager, but in February 2018, he was named the head coach of the club. Managing Gorica, he won the 2017–18 Croatian Second Football League. In June 2018, he left Gorica and became the assistant manager of Legia Warsaw under the coaching staff of Dean Klafurić.

On 15 June 2019, he was named the new manager of NK Istra 1961, succeeding Igor Cvitanović.

On 15 March 2022, he became manager of Danish Superliga club Vejle Boldklub.

Managerial statistics

Honours
Manager
 Croatian Second Football League: 2017–18

References 

1987 births
Living people
Sportspeople from Zagreb
Croatian football managers
HNK Gorica managers
NK Istra 1961 managers
Vejle Boldklub managers
Danish Superliga managers
Croatian expatriate football managers
Expatriate football managers in Denmark
Croatian expatriate sportspeople in Denmark
GNK Dinamo Zagreb non-playing staff